The Oreanda Hotel is a 4-star, historic hotel in Yalta, Crimea, opened in 1907. It is considered a city landmark and overlooks the coastline and neighboring mountains.

Rooms and suites
The Oreanda offers 119 rooms, the majority with sea and mountain views decorated in traditional style. There are 21 junior suites, 14 suites and 5 apartments. Two themed apartments bear the names of "Massandra" and "Livadia" – famous Crimean palaces which once belonged to the Russian Emperor Family - and another apartment is named "Imperial".

History
The Hotel was built in 1907 by Alexander Vitmer – a retired general with Danish origins who was a prosperous businessman, writer and painter. The hotel was considered the best in the Yalta district and the whole of Crimea.
Pre-revolutionary guide-books state that the hotel had "perfect provision, excellent furniture, mirror glasses, fresh air and a well kept garden around". In the lobby an incomparable smell of cigars mixed with a delicate aroma of ground coffee and expensive perfumes, its art saloon exhibited the masterpieces of Aivazovskiy, Shishkin, Makovskiy, Vereschagin and other maitres who started cultural traditions of Oreanda.

In 1918, during the revolutionary period in Yalta, the hotel served as a fort post and defensive fortification for the Crimean opponents of Bolsheviks.

At the beginning of the World War II, a military hospital was placed here. After the war, the hotel was converted into a recreation centre where the wounded soldiers and officers were treated. By the end of the 1950s with capital repairs, the Oreanda regained the status of a hotel.

At the beginning of the 1970s the hotel was remodeled. It was completely restored in 2001. It was again renovated in 2007.

Logo
The logo of the hotel is a seashell. The design of the Oreanda building resembles a spiral when viewed from above. When the Oreanda logo was approved, construction workers were disassembling one of the banquette room walls and found an ancient tapestry showing a seashell in its center.

External links
 Official website

Hotels in Yalta
Hotel buildings completed in 1907
Hotels established in 1907
1907 establishments in the Russian Empire